The 2007 World Series was the championship series of Major League Baseball's (MLB) 2007 season. The 103rd edition of the World Series, it was a best-of-seven playoff between the National League (NL) champion Colorado Rockies and the American League (AL) champion Boston Red Sox; the Red Sox swept the Rockies in four games. It was the Rockies' only appearance in a World Series. The Red Sox's victory was their second World Series championship in four seasons and their seventh overall; it also marked the third sweep in four years by the AL champions. The series began on Wednesday, October 24 and ended on Sunday, October 28.

Terry Francona became the second Red Sox manager to win two World Series titles, following Bill Carrigan, who won the 1915 and 1916 World Series. Including the last three games of the AL Championship Series, the Red Sox outscored their opposition 59–15 over their final seven games. Francona also became the first manager to win his first 8 World Series games. The Rockies, meanwhile, became the first NL team to get swept in a World Series after sweeping the League Championship Series, and just the second team ever to suffer such a fate, following the Oakland Athletics in 1990. This fate would again be suffered by the 2012 Detroit Tigers, being swept by the San Francisco Giants in the World Series after sweeping the New York Yankees in the ALCS. As of 2022, this remains the most recent time an American League team has swept a National League team in the World Series.

Background

This was the fourth time since the beginning of interleague play in 1997 that a World Series matchup would be a rematch from the regular season. The Rockies beat the Red Sox 2-1 in a three game series at Fenway Park from June 12–14.

The Rockies entered the Series having won 21 of their last 22 games, going back to the end of the regular season, including sweeps of the Philadelphia Phillies in the NLDS and the Arizona Diamondbacks in the NLCS. They also beat the San Diego Padres in the NL Wild Card tie-breaker. The Red Sox swept the Los Angeles Angels of Anaheim in the ALDS and defeated the Cleveland Indians in the ALCS after trailing three games to one, taking the final three contests by a combined score of 30–5. Neither participating team was in the previous year's postseason. The Rockies' eight-day layoff was the longest in MLB postseason history, caused by their sweep in the NLCS, the ALCS going seven games, and scheduling by MLB.

Per the 2006 Collective Bargaining Agreement, the Red Sox had home-field advantage in the World Series following the American League's 5–4 win in the 2007 All-Star Game. The first two games took place in Boston, with games 3 and 4 in Denver.

Summary

Matchups

Game 1

The Red Sox cruised to a blowout win in Game 1 behind ALCS MVP Josh Beckett, who struck out nine batters, including the first four he faced, over seven innings en route to his fourth win of the 2007 postseason. Mike Timlin and Éric Gagné pitched a perfect eighth and ninth, respectively.

Boston Hall of Famer Carl Yastrzemski threw the ceremonial first pitch, as he had done before Game 1 in 2004. Rookie Dustin Pedroia led off the Sox' first inning with a home run over the Green Monster in Fenway Park off of Jeff Francis. Pedroia's homer was only the second lead-off home run to start a World Series (the only other one was hit by Baltimore's Don Buford in 1969). Kevin Youkilis then doubled to right, moved to third on David Ortiz's groundout, and scored on Manny Ramirez's single. After Mike Lowell flew out, Jason Varitek singled before J. D. Drew doubled to score Ramirez and make it 3-0 Red Sox.

The Rockies got on the board in the second when Garrett Atkins doubled with one out off Beckett and scored on Troy Tulowitzki's double one out later, but the Red Sox got that run back off of Francis when Youkilis walked with two outs and scored on Ortiz's double. In the fourth, the Red Sox loaded the bases with two outs on a single, double, and intentional walk when Varitek's two-run double put them up 6–1.

They put the game out of reach with seven runs in the fifth. Julio Lugo hit a leadoff single off of reliever Franklin Morales before Jacoby Ellsbury bunted into a forceout at second. After Pedroia popped out, a balk moved Ellsbury to second before he scored on Youkilis's double. Ortiz's double and Ramirez's single scored a run each. The Red Sox loaded the bases on a double and walk before Drew's single scored another run. Ryan Speier relieved Morales and walked all three batters he faced to force in three more Boston runs. Matt Herges relieved Speier and got Youkilis to fly out to right to end the inning.

Though Herges and two relievers held Boston scoreless for the rest of the game, the Red Sox finished with 13 runs, the most ever in a World Series Game 1, and tied another record with nine extra base hits. The last 11 of the Red Sox runs came with two outs.

Game 2

The ceremonial first pitch was thrown by Andrew Madden, a 13-year-old heart transplant recipient, accompanied by Boston Red Sox Hall of Fame member Dwight Evans. After the debacle of Game 1, Colorado appeared to return to form, scoring quickly on a groundout by Todd Helton with runners on second and third in the first. However, this would be the only time the Rockies ever led in the series as postseason veteran Curt Schilling ( IP, one run, four hits) and Boston's bullpen (Okajima,  IP; Papelbon,  IP) allowed no other runs in the contest. The Red Sox tied the game in the fourth off of Ubaldo Jimenez on Jason Varitek's sacrifice fly with runners on second and third, then took the lead next inning on Mike Lowell's RBI double with runners on first and second. Matt Holliday had four of Colorado's five hits in Game 2, including a base hit off Papelbon with two outs in the eighth. Before throwing another pitch, Papelbon caught Holliday leaning too far off first base and picked him off—Papelbon's first career pickoff.

Game 3

This was the first World Series game ever played in Colorado. At 4 hours 19 minutes, it became the longest nine-inning game in World Series history until game five of 2017. Game 3 was also the 600th World Series game ever played. Starting pitcher Daisuke Matsuzaka pitched five innings of scoreless ball and left in the sixth with no runs allowed. The Red Sox struck first with a six-run third inning. Rookie Jacoby Ellsbury hit a leadoff double, moved to third on Dustin Pedroia's single, and scored on David Ortiz's double. After Manny Ramirez was intentionally walked, Mike Lowell's single scored two more runs. J. D. Drew popped out before Ramirez was thrown out at home on Jason Varitek's single with Lowell advancing to third. After Julio Lugo walked to load the bases, Matsuzaka hit a two-run single for his first base hit and RBI in the Major Leagues. Ellsbury capped the scoring with his second double of the inning to knock Colorado starter Josh Fogg out of the game. The Rockies' bats came to life in the sixth and seventh innings against a normally-solid but now-shaky Boston bullpen. After Matsuzaka walked two straight in the sixth with one out, reliever Javier López allowed back-to-back RBI singles to Brad Hawpe and Yorvit Torrealba. Mike Timlin allowed two straight leadoff singles in the seventh before NLCS MVP Matt Holliday brought the Rockies to within one run with a three-run home run off Hideki Okajima. Brian Fuentes gave back those runs in the eighth by walking Lugo with one out and allowing a subsequent single to Coco Crisp before Ellsbury and Dustin Pedroia, who had four and three hits, respectively, on the night (the first time in World Series history two rookies had at least three hits in a game) hit back-to-back RBI doubles, raising Boston's lead to 9–5. Jonathan Papelbon came on for a four-out save, getting Holliday to fly out on one pitch, leaving runners on first and second. Jason Varitek would tack on Boston's tenth run in the top of the ninth off of LaTroy Hawkins with a sacrifice fly, scoring Mike Lowell who, not generally considered a stolen base threat, had just stolen third base—the first time a Red Sox baserunner stole third base in the World Series since 1975—after hitting a leadoff single and moving to second on a sacrifice bunt. Papelbon came back out in the bottom of the ninth to complete the save, getting the first two outs before surrendering a two-out triple to Brad Hawpe, then finishing the game with a groundout from Yorvit Torrealba. The Red Sox took Game 3 by a final score of 10–5.

The Red Sox continued to set World Series records during Game 3:
Ellsbury (four hits) and Pedroia (three) combined to score three runs and drive in four, while being the first rookies to bat 1–2 in a World Series lineup.
Ellsbury became the third rookie in Series history with four hits in a game, joining Freddie Lindstrom of the New York Giants (Game 5, 1924) and Joe Garagiola of the Cardinals (Game 4, 1946).
Matsuzaka became the first Japanese pitcher to start and win a World Series game.
The Red Sox' 16 doubles tied a World Series record, set by the  Champion Cardinals. The Red Sox would break the record in Game 4, finishing with 18.

Game 4

The Red Sox struck early. Rookie Jacoby Ellsbury began the first inning with a double and was advanced by Dustin Pedroia with a groundout, followed by an RBI single from David Ortiz. In the seventh inning, series MVP Mike Lowell hit a home run to give Boston a 3–0 lead and knock starter Aaron Cook out of the game. Lowell also hit a leadoff double in the fifth and scored on Jason Varitek's single. The Colorado offense answered when left fielder Brad Hawpe hit a home run off of a Manny Delcarmen fastball, bringing the Rockies within two. Relief pitcher Brian Fuentes gave back that run abruptly, allowing Boston pinch-hitter Bobby Kielty to hit a ball into the left field stands on the first pitch of the inning, extending the Red Sox lead to 4–1. In the bottom of the inning Boston pitcher Hideki Okajima allowed a one-out single to Todd Helton followed by a Garrett Atkins two-run home run, bringing the Rockies within one. Jonathan Papelbon relieved Okajima and earned his third save of the series. At 12:06 a.m. EDT on Monday, October 29, Papelbon struck out Colorado pinch hitter Seth Smith for the final out of the 2007 season. Boston had won its second World Series title in four years and seventh all-time.

There was controversy in the top of the eighth when Fox's broadcast announced that Alex Rodriguez would be opting out of his contract with the Yankees to become a free agent. Commissioner Bud Selig made it clear during the World Series that an embargo had been placed on all Major League Baseball stories until the sport's top event had come to an end. Rodriguez and his agent Scott Boras would later apologize for the incident.
 
The Rockies became the third team in Series history (the 1937 Yankees and 1966 Orioles were the others) not to commit an error in a World Series of any length.

Composite line score

2007 World Series (4–0): Boston Red Sox (A.L.) beat Colorado Rockies (N.L.).

Ticket controversy

On October 17, 2007, a week before the first game of the World Series, the Colorado Rockies announced that tickets would be made available to the general public via online sales only, despite prior arrangements to sell the tickets at local retail outlets. Five days later, California-based ticket vendor Paciolan, Inc., the sole contractor authorized by the Colorado Rockies to distribute tickets, was forced to suspend sales after less than an hour due to an exorbitant number of purchase attempts.
  
The Rockies organization said that they were the victims of a denial-of-service attack.  The FBI started its own investigation into these claims.  Ticket sales resumed the next day, with all three home games selling out within  hours.

The Red Sox also relied primarily on online sales to sell the game tickets, although some Fenway Park tickets were sold on the phone and at the box office. The Sox held a random drawing for the right to buy post season tickets on October 15, and winners bought tickets at a private online sale. Street prices were lower in Boston this time than in 2004: the average price, according to StubHub, was about $1500 in 2007, down about $300 from three years previously.  Some Sox fans found that it was cheaper to travel to Denver to see World Series games than to pay the street price for Boston game tickets.

Celebration
While the celebratory crowd at Kenmore Square was not as unruly as in 2004, cars were overturned and 37 arrests were made. The Red Sox victory parade, yet again in duck boats and called a "Rolling Rally" as in 2004, was on October 30, 2007 with closer Jonathan Papelbon doing his infamous "Riverdance" while local punk band the Dropkick Murphys played their hit "I'm Shipping Up to Boston".

The Red Sox World Series win in 2007 continued the success of Boston-area teams in recent years. The Celtics won their 17th championship, their first championship since , the last time the Red Sox lost in the World Series,  months later.

Broadcasting
The World Series was televised by Fox in the United States, with Joe Buck and Tim McCarver as booth announcers. The starting time for each television broadcast was 8:00 pm EDT (6:00 pm MDT). The series broke with the recent tradition of starting the World Series on a Saturday, as Major League Baseball had become convinced that weekend games drew lower television ratings. Prior to this season, every World Series since 1985 had opened on a Saturday, with the exception of the 1990 World Series. This was the first World Series to start on a Wednesday since 1968.

Rogers Sportsnet (RSN) in Canada used the MLB International feed with Dave O'Brien and Rick Sutcliffe as booth announcers. NASN showed the games live to most of Europe, while in the UK, all games were shown terrestrially on Five. NHK aired the Series in Japan.

On radio, the Series was broadcast nationally by ESPN Radio, with Jon Miller and Joe Morgan announcing.  Locally, Joe Castiglione and Glenn Geffner called the Series for the Red Sox on WRKO in Boston, while Jack Corrigan and Jeff Kingery called it for the Rockies on KOA in Denver. Per contractual obligation, the non-flagship stations on the teams' radio networks carried the ESPN Radio broadcasts.

Aftermath

Red Sox
As previously mentioned, the Red Sox won two more World Series titles in 2013 and 2018. Both of those titles were managed by two members of the 2007 club. Pitching coach John Farrell served as the skipper of the 2013 Red Sox, featuring 2007 holdovers Clay Buchholz (DNP), Jacoby Ellsbury, Jon Lester, David Ortiz, and Dustin Pedroia. The 2018 Red Sox was managed by Alex Cora, an infielder on the 2007 team. 

The Red Sox finished as a wild-card team in the 2008 season, winning 95 games. They were defeated in the ALCS by the Tampa Bay Rays in seven games. The Red Sox again qualified as a 95-win wild-card team in 2009, but lost 3–0 to the Los Angeles Angels in the ALDS. In both 2010 and 2011, the Red Sox missed the postseason despite winning 89 and 90 games, respectively. The 2011 season saw the Red Sox hold a nine-game lead in the wild card heading to September, only to lose 13 of their final 20 games to miss the playoffs. This led to the dismissal of skipper Terry Francona.

Rockies
After making the World Series in 2007, the Rockies proceeded to appear in the playoffs only three times in the next 15 seasons. In 2009, the Rockies won a wild-card berth after winning 92 games, but in a rematch of the 2007 NLDS, the Rockies lost in four games to the Philadelphia Phillies. During that season, the Rockies fired Clint Hurdle and replaced him with Jim Tracy. The Rockies never finished higher than third place in the NL West between 2010 and 2017, though in the latter season, they returned to postseason play as a second wild-card team. There, the Rockies lost in the Wild Card Game to the Arizona Diamondbacks. The following season, the Rockies made consecutive postseason appearances for the first time in team history, winning the Wild Card Game against the Chicago Cubs, but losing in the NLDS to the Milwaukee Brewers 3–0.

The Pirates proceeded to make the postseason three consecutive years under Hurdle, winning the 2013 National League Wild Card Game during that span.

Three members of the 2007 Rockies went on to win a World Series ring with other teams.

See also
2007 Asia Series
2007 Korean Series
2007 Japan Series

Notes

External links

World Series
World Series
Boston Red Sox postseason
Colorado Rockies postseason
World Series
World Series
2000s in Denver
World Series
Baseball competitions in Denver
Baseball competitions in Boston
World Series